Cheilosia latifrons is a species of 'Flower Flies' or hoverflies belonging to the family Syrphidae subfamily Eristalinae. 
 

This species is present in most of Europe, in the eastern Palearctic realm to Siberia, in the Near East, and in North Africa.

It is low-flying, at the level of grasses and other low plants, among which it settles. Flowers visited include yellow Compositae, especially Senecio and Taraxacum; Origanum, Ranunculus, Luzula and Plantago.

The body is glossy black, with yellowish hair. Legs are yellow with a broad, black ring in the middle and the tarsi are dark. The scutellum is without obvious bristly hairs at margin, the antennae are black or partly or entirely dark reddish. The thorax is finely punctate.

The larvae probably develop in roots and stems of Leontodon autumnalis and Crepis species.

References

External links
 External images
 Fauna Europaea 
 Biolib
 Hoverfly
 Syrphidae
 Commanster

Eristalinae
Insects described in 1843
Diptera of Africa